Sparrow Bush is a hamlet (and census designated place) in the town of Deerpark, in Orange County, New York, United States. The population as of the 2020 census is 981. Sparrow Bush has a post office with ZIP code 12780. The community is named after Henry L. Sparrow who owned a large piece of woodland near the D&H canal.The locals started to call this piece of land Sparrow's “Bosh” (meaning Sparrow's slope) and Sparrow's “Bosk” (meaning Sparrow's woods). Over time the name of the town gradually evolved into Sparrow bush.

It is zoned to Port Jervis School District, which operates Port Jervis High School and 2 Elementary Schools.

Geography 
Sparrow Bush is located at  (41.2400, -74.4324)

References

Hamlets in Orange County, New York
Hamlets in New York (state)